Langt fra Las Vegas (Far from Las Vegas) is a Danish sit-com, which was first aired on the Danish TV channel TV2 Zulu. It revolved around life at a newly started TV morning show, Jump Start, and focused on the life of the main character, Casper (played by Casper Christensen).

Langt fra Las Vegas consisted of 53 episodes, aired over 5 seasons with each episode lasting 25 minutes. It ran from 2001 to 2003.

Overview
The sit-com takes places in the studio and offices of fictional TV channel show Jump Start and in the main character Casper's apartment, both located in Copenhagen, Denmark.

Generally the main story revolves around Casper (in later seasons referred to as by his full name, Casper Christensen) who is usually in trouble and tries to fix it with a lie, but always ends up getting caught. Issues of relationships and sex are often central to the show, and topics such as paedophilia and other taboos are touched upon often with a rich imagery (mainly by Casper's boss Niels Buckingham). The show originated on a cable-channel targeting young adults (TV2 Zulu) and successfully made it to the parent, nationwide channel TV2 without any censoring.

The city of Las Vegas is never featured nor even mentioned in Langt fra Las Vegas, possibly a reference to the lack of professionalism and showmanship of the characters.

The show drastically changed tone from season 1 to 2. Two characters, Wulff and Anne, were completely written out, and several characters returned with their personalities completely changed, such as Kenny being changed from the office smart-ass to a geeky character; Robert being changed from a childish security chief to a seemingly retarded cameraman; and Niels Buckingham, who had been an off-beat character whose sexual deviances were often briefly mentioned, being amplified into a full-blown pervert with every conceivable sexual fetish.

Characters
 Casper Christensen - Casper Christensen (Season 1-5)
Casper is a young man working as a host/comedian on an unspecified TV-show on the TV channel "Jump Start". Throughout the series he battles with relationships which he sometimes takes very seriously and at other times views with indifference or engages himself with women out of spite (of former or to-be girlfriends) or in search of sex. He is light tempered and forgiving but often childishly stubborn and a (selfproclaimed?) sex symbol.
 Kenny Nickelman - Frank Hvam (Season 1-5)
Kenny is Casper's best friend. The first season aside, he is a sports journalist on the TV channel "Jump Start". He is usually impeccably dressed in outfits meant for much older or more distinguishable men (tweed, caps, suspenders etc.). Often in bad luck and quite a geek, he is in many ways the complete opposite of Casper.
 Niels Buckingham - Klaus Bondam (Season 1-5)
Niels is an anchor-man at the TV channel "Jump Start" and from season 2 and onwards the CEO of the station. Niels has worked as a foreign correspondent throughout his seemingly long career and often regales in absurd stories from his experiences. He is a blatant pervert with many sexual fetishes, including some illegal ones such as paedophilia and necrophilia. Additionally, he also has various extreme or elaborate fetishes which he often hints at in a rather obvious language. He is also very outspoken about non-sexual intimacies, such as bowel-movements (in one episode he ceremoniously informs the staff that he has diarrhea and then confines himself to his office, ordering Robert to fetch him a large bowl and some old newspapers, his preferred brand of toiletpaper etc.). Niels continuously finds himself in embarrassing situations but sometimes fails to see the problem. At other times he is quite vain.
 Liva Eberhardt - Iben Hjejle (Season 2-5)
On-off girlfriend of Casper. An architect by trade but is later hired as a chief of public relations at the TV channel "Jump Start". Is very intelligent, caring and openminded of some things, but obliviously not to the problems of others, in particular Casper's.
 Lisa Bremer Harris - Katja K (Season 1-5)
Lisa is a secretary at the TV channel "Jump Start". In real life, Katja K was a porn star before being cast for the role as Lisa, a fact that is played upon in the pilot. She is the most sensible and stable person on the Jump Start staff and has frequent run-ins with Robert, her direct opposite.
 Robert Dølhus - Lars Hjortshøj (Season 1-5)
Robert is a cameraman and video-editor on the TV-channel "Jump Start". He is practically a child in a grown person's body, lives on candy and junk food and is constantly making childish references to breasts. Is the favored Guinea pig of Niels who often experiments with different things on Robert or gives him absurd tasks, almost always to Roberts annoyance. Robert is a Hi-Fi enthusiast - purist even.
 Kim Dorowsky - Sofie Stougaard (Season 1-5)
Kim is at first the chief at the TV channel "Jump Start", but after season one resigns to write a book on boxing. Is briefly married to Casper (unhappily).
 Wulff - Mikael Wulff (Season 1)
 Anne - Stine Stengade (Season 1)

Regular guest cast
 Mogens Knibbe Eberhardt - Henning Jensen
Authoritative father of Liva. An MD by trade and a very orthodox one at that. Cares immensely for Liva's well-being and is very suspicious of Casper and his motives with Liva. 
 Vibeke Eberhardt - Solbjerg Højfeldt
Seemingly submissive wife of Mogens and mother of Liva. Is often being bullied by husband Mogens who, however, loves her dearly.

Episodes

Season one
 En Ordentlig Sneppetur
 Trillekød
 Danish Dynamite
 Ordnung Muss Sein
 Kærlighedspokalen
 Proletarkæden
 Sexfreak
 Se & Hor
 Heidi (Del 1)
 Heidi (Del 2)
 En på Egnsdragten
 IT Phone Home
 Helmig Fucki Fucki

Season two
 Lars Herlow
 Mia Hundvin
 John Travolta
 Mek Pek
 Mufufu
 Michel
 Liva
 Mogens K. Eberhart
 Monsieur Dipp
 Oliver

Season three
 Feng Shui
 Kat
 Laust
 Polle Pot
 Bedste, det er bare mig
 Tis
 Jeopardy
 Kærlighed gør blind
 Som søn så far
 Det sidste ord

Season four
 Pressemødet
 Don't Wanna Lus You Now
 Starfucker
 Mere møs til Dennis
 Tino, Gunnar og en hel krukke bolsjer
 Ultimate Kosher
 Arrivederci Kenny
 Nestor
 Trøstepagten
 Kammeratstolen

Season five
 Skat
 DVD-aftener
 Den forsølvede barnesko
 Hvem ka' Lie Kaas
 Picaspero
 Onani
 Who is Your Daddy
 Herretur
 Kim og femidomet
 Et fister øjeblik

External links
 IMDb's profile

Danish comedy television series
2000s Danish television series
2003 Danish television series endings
2001 Danish television series debuts
Danish-language television shows
TV 2 Zulu original programming